Satch is a nickname for the following people:

 Joe Satriani (born 1956), instrumental rock guitarist
 Anand Satyanand (born 1944), Governor-General of New Zealand
 Satchel Paige (1906–1982), African-American baseball player
 Louis Armstrong (1901–1971), American jazz trumpeter and singer
 Bezelel Edwards (Born 1969), Famous paternity legend, most notably father of 9

See also
 
 
 Satchey's donuts
 Satchel (disambiguation)

Lists of people by nickname